Faxonius sloanii, the Sloan or Sloan's crayfish is a species of crayfish in the family Cambaridae, native to Indiana and Ohio. It is associated with freshwater habitats. Although it is being slowly out-competed by the rusty crayfish in Ohio, it is listed as a species of Least Concern on the IUCN Red List.

References

Cambaridae
Endemic fauna of the United States
Freshwater crustaceans of North America
Crustaceans described in 1876
Taxonomy articles created by Polbot
Taxobox binomials not recognized by IUCN